FAP 1117 was the predecessor of the latest FAP military truck version, FAP 1118. This is an all-terrain vehicle developed by VTI and scheduled for production by FAP factory in Priboj. It was not introduced in serial production, being only prototype, while its lightly improved successor, FAP 1118 is in full serial production.

It is designed for transport of personnel, weapons and material of up to 4t gross weight, as well as for towing of artillery pieces and trailers. Equipped with all-wheel drive, locking of all differentials and powerful diesel engine, the vehicle is able to negotiate cross-country gradients of 60%. Central regulation of tire pressure assures high mobility over soft soil and its well thought out body geometry enables easy negotiating of natural and man-made obstacles such as trenches, railway embankments, escarps etc.

Technical characteristics
Model	1117 BS/36 4x4
Gross vehicle weight[kg]	11.000
Front axle permissible weight[kg]	5200
Rear axle permissible weight[kg]	5800
Pay load[kg]	4000
Engine - type	MB OM 904 LA EU3
Number of cylinders	4
Bore/stroke [mm] 	102/130
Displacement [dm3]	4250
Power [kW (HP)/min-1]	130(174KS)/2200
Peak torque [Nm/min-1]	675/1200-1600
Electrical system [V]	24
Batteries	2 x 12 V/110 Ah
Clutch	GMF 330 X
Gearbox	FAP 5MS 60.075
Gear ratio 	8.02
Reverse 	6.92
Front axle	AL 3/1 D-6
Rear axle	  FAP NG 10 t
Total transmission ratio	 6.143
Steering	PPT 8042
Cabin	short
Size of cargo body [mm]	4000 x 2430 x 1700
Wheel	9,00 -  22,5
Rims	9.0 - 18	 
Tire	13 R 18 PR 12
Brakes 	Pneumatic dual circuit with ALB
Fuel tank capacity [1]	216
Max. speed [km/h]	93
Max. grading [%]	60

References

1117
Military trucks